Volodymyr Byelikov (born 1 December 1998) is a Ukrainian ice dancer who currently competes for Israel with Shira Ichilov. With his former skating partner, Darya Popova, he is the 2017 Volvo Open Cup silver medalist and 2019 Ukrainian national champion on the senior level. The team has finished within the top twelve at two World Junior Championships (2017, 2018).

Career

Early years 
Byelikov began learning to skate in 2004. He skated with Anna Demidenko before teaming up with Anzhelika Yurchenko in 2013. Yurchenko/Byelikov's first international junior competition was the NRW Trophy in November 2013. In August 2014, they debuted on the ISU Junior Grand Prix (JGP) series, placing 13th in Courchevel, France. They received a total of four JGP assignments and achieved their best result, 8th, in August 2015 in Riga, Latvia.

After winning gold at the 2016 Ukrainian Junior Championships, Yurchenko/Byelikov represented Ukraine at the 2016 Winter Youth Olympics, held in February in Hamar, Norway. They ranked fifth in both segments and fifth overall. In March, the two competed at the 2016 World Junior Championships in Debrecen, Hungary. They placed 15th in the short dance, 16th in the free dance, and 15th overall. Halyna Churylova and Mariana Kozlova coached the team in Kharkiv.

2016–2017 season 
Byelikov and Darya Popova teamed up in 2016, coached by Halyna Churylova and Mariana Kozlova in Kharkiv. They made their international debut at the ISU Junior Grand Prix in the Czech Republic in early September 2016. They placed 8th in Ostrava and 7th at their next JGP assignment, in Tallinn, Estonia. The duo took silver at the senior-level Ukrainian Championship before winning gold at the junior event.

Popova/Byelikov were selected to represent Ukraine at the 2017 World Junior Championships in Taipei, Taiwan; they placed 11th in the short dance, 12th in the free dance, and 12th overall.

2017–2018 season 
During the 2017 JGP series, Popova/Byelikov placed 6th competing in September in Minsk, Belarus, and 5th in early October in Gdańsk, Poland. Their senior international debut came in November at the Volvo Open Cup in Riga, Latvia. They won silver at the event, finishing second to Germany's Katharina Müller / Tim Dieck and ahead of Hungary's Anna Yanovskaya / Ádám Lukács.

Continuing on the senior level, Popova/Byelikov placed 9th at the 2017 CS Tallinn Trophy, 8th at the Santa Claus Cup, and second at the Ukrainian Championships. They were included in Ukraine's team to the 2018 European Championships, held in January in Moscow, but did not reach the free dance, placing 22nd in the short. In March, they competed at the 2018 World Junior Championships in Sofia (Bulgaria), ranking 9th in the short, 11th in the free, and 11th overall.

2018–2019 season 
Popova/Byelikov won bronze at their first 2018 Junior Grand Prix event in Lithuania, and then placed fourth in Slovenia.  Following that, they competed at the 2018 CS Tallinn Trophy, placing fifth, and won their first Ukrainian national title.  After a sixteenth-place finish at the 2019 European Championships, they competed at the 2019 World Junior Championships, placing eleventh.

2019–2020 season 
Competing in two Challenger events, Popova/Byelikov placed twelfth at the 2019 CS Nebelhorn Trophy and tenth at the 2019 CS Golden Spin of Zagreb.  They won the silver medal at the Ukrainian championships, and competed at a number of minor internationals.

2020–2021 season 
Beginning the season at the 2020 CS Nebelhorn Trophy, which due to the COVID-19 pandemic was attended only by European skaters.  They won the bronze medal.

2021–2022 season 
Following the dissolution of his partnership with Popova, Byelikov formed a new partnership with Israeli ice dancer Shira Ichilov to represent her country. They debuted at the Israeli championships, winning the silver medal, before earning their international minimums at the Bavarian Open, placing sixth. They were fourth at the Egna Trophy, before making their World Championship debut at the 2022 World Championships in Montpellier. They placed twenty-first, and were the first team to miss qualifying for the free dance.

Programs

With Ichilov

With Popova

With Yurchenko

Competitive highlights 
CS: Challenger Series; JGP: Junior Grand Prix

With Ichilov for Israel

With Popova for Ukraine

With Yurchenko for Ukraine

References

External links 

 
 

1998 births
Ukrainian male ice dancers
Living people
Sportspeople from Kharkiv
Figure skaters at the 2016 Winter Youth Olympics